Trédarzec is a commune in the Côtes-d'Armor department of Brittany in northwestern France.

Etymology
The name is treb = farmstead, tarz = spring.

Population

Inhabitants of Trédarzec are called trédarzécois in French.

International relations
Trédarzec is  twinned with the village of St. Dogmaels in Pembrokeshire, Wales.

See also
Communes of the Côtes-d'Armor department

References

External links

 Trédarzec Website (in French)
 Trédarzec Info Website (in French)

Communes of Côtes-d'Armor